This is the list of the members of the Parliament of Finland between September 5, 1922 – April 30, 1924 following the parliamentary election in 1922.

Members of the Parliament 1922–1924
In the table, the names written with italics were appointed to the Parliament later than September 5, 1922—the first day of the new Parliament—to replace those who had died or resigned.

Notes

References

 

1922
Parliament